Dhungegadhi is a town and Village Development Committee in Pyuthan, a Middle Hills district of Rapti Zone, western Nepal.

Etymology

dhunge - stony, made of stone
gadhi - tower, fortress
Thus: stone tower or fortress

Villages in VDC

References

External links
UN map of VDC boundaries, water features and roads in Pyuthan District

Populated places in Pyuthan District